Footer may refer to:

 Football, especially association football (soccer) or rugby
 Page footer, in word processing, the bottom portion of a page
 Website footer, the bottom section of a website
 Footer or footing, a form of foundation in building construction
 The unit of measure of difficulty of a particular song in the video game Dance Dance Revolution.  ex. 'Can't Stop Fallin' in Love on Heavy' is a 9 footer
 Trailer (computing), supplemental data placed at the end of a block of data being stored or transmitted, which may contain information for the handling of the data block, or just mark its end.

See also
Footnote